CSIC may refer to:

 Cabinet Satellite Intelligence Center, the satellite surveillance unit of the Japanese intelligence agency
 Centre for the Study of Contemporary Islam, an Italian study centre on Islam
 China Shipbuilding Industry Corporation, a shipbuilding conglomerate
 Chinese Standard Interchange Code, the standard character set of the Republic of China
 Central States Intercollegiate Conference, a defunct American intercollegiate athletic conference
 Customer-Specified Integrated Circuit
 Spanish National Research Council, a Spanish national research agency